John James Wade (7 June 1871 – 1937) was an English footballer who played in the Football League for Blackburn Rovers and Darwen.

References

1871 births
1937 deaths
English footballers
Association football forwards
English Football League players
Darwen F.C. players
Blackburn Rovers F.C. players